The Portland Football Club is an Australian rules football club based in the western suburbs of Adelaide which was formed in 1997 as a merger between the former Alberton United Football Club, Ethelton Football Club and Riverside Football Club. The club has participated in the South Australian Amateur Football League since being formed.

A-Grade Premierships 
 South Australian Amateur Football League Division 2 (1)
 2013 
 South Australian Amateur Football League Division 4 (2)
 2000 
 2008

Merger history 
Portland Football Club was formed in 1997 from a merger of Alberton United, Ethelton and Riverside.

Alberton United 
The Alberton United Football Club was formed in 1915 as the Alberton Church United Football Club based at Queenstown Oval.  Initially playing in the Port Adelaide and Suburban Football Association, Alberton Church United shifted to the South Australian Amateur Football League (SAAFL) in 1931.  In 1941, they went into recess due to World War II, before returning to the SAAFL in 1946.  In 1955 Alberton Church United changed its name to Alberton United, and continued under that name until it merged with Ethelton and Riverside in 1997 to form Portland.

A-Grade Premierships
 Port Adelaide and District Football Association (1)
 1925 
 South Australian Amateur Football League A2 (4)
 1931 
 1937 
 1948 
 1962 
 South Australian Amateur Football League A3 (1)
 1971 
 South Australian Amateur Football League A6 (1)
 1994

Ethelton 

The Ethelton Football Club was established in 1911 and was a longtime member of the Port Adelaide and District Football Association (PADFA).  When the PADFA folded in 1952, Ethelton transferred to the West Torrens District Football Association until it joined the South Australian Amateur Football League (SAAFL) in 1956, where it remained until it entered a merger in 1997 with Alberton United and Riverside to form Portland.

A-Grade Premierships
 Port Adelaide and Suburban Football Association (2)
 1913 
 1915 
 Port Adelaide and District Football Association (1)
 1924 
 South Australian Amateur Football League A3 (1)
 1982 
 South Australian Amateur Football League A4 (1)
 1957 
 South Australian Amateur Football League A5 (1)
 1956

Riverside 

The Riverside Football Club was formed in 1928 and initially participated in the Port Adelaide and District Football Association, followed by a stint in the Adelaide and Suburban Football Association. In 1949, Riverside joined the South Australian Amateur Football League where it remained until it merged with Alberton United and Ethelton in 1997 to form Portland.

A-Grade Premierships
 Port Adelaide and District Football Association (5)
 1933  
 1934  
 1935
 1936 
 1937 
 South Australian Amateur Football League A1 (3)
 1958 
 1983 
 1984 
 South Australian Amateur Football League A2 (3)
 1950 
 1964 
 1992

References

External links
 

Australian rules football clubs in South Australia
Australian rules football clubs established in 1997
1997 establishments in Australia
Adelaide Footy League clubs